Practice what you preach may refer to:

 Practice What You Preach, a 1989 thrash metal album by Testament
 "Practice What You Preach" (Testament song), the album's title track
 "Practice What You Preach" (Barry White song), a 1994 R&B single by Barry White